Blagger is a platform game created by Antony Crowther for the Commodore 64 and released by Alligata in 1983. A BBC Micro port was released the same year, Acorn Electron, Amstrad CPC (through Amsoft) and MSX in 1984, Commodore 16 and Plus/4 in 1985 and Amstrad PCW in 1987. In some countries this game was released under the name Gangster. 

Son of Blagger, was released in 1984 with a third and final title Blagger Goes to Hollywood released in 1985. Another sequel, known as New Blagger but developed as Blagger 2, being a direct continuation of the original, was produced in 1985 but not released.

Gameplay

The game is divided into a series of single-screen levels. The goal of the player on each screen is to manipulate Blagger, a burglar, to collect the scattered keys and then reach the safe. The keys must be collected and the safe opened in a limited amount of time. Blagger can walk left and right, and jump left, right and up. The jumping action is in a fixed pattern and cannot be altered once initiated. Gameplay involves learning the best order in which to collect the keys, and good timing of movement and jumping.

Not all platforms are permanent; some decay once Blagger has stepped on them. Other platforms serve to move Blagger in a particular direction. Blagger will die if he touches cacti, one of the moving enemy obstacles of the level, or if he falls more than a certain distance. The moving enemies vary from level to level, and include cars, aliens, mad hatters, and giant mouths. The movement of the enemies is in a fixed pattern, generally travelling from one point to another and back again.

The BBC and Electron versions feature floating "RG"s as hazards (R.G. being the initials of the programmer of those versions, R.S. Goodley).

Reception

References

External links

A remake of the original Blagger at Darn Kitty
Blagger at Plus/4 World
Complete video from the C64 version at Internet Archive

1983 video games
Amsoft games
Amstrad CPC games
Amstrad PCW games
BBC Micro and Acorn Electron games
Commodore 16 and Plus/4 games
Commodore 64 games
MSX games
Platform games
Single-player video games
Video games about crime
Video games developed in the United Kingdom
Alligata games